Tatami iwashi is a Japanese processed food made from baby sardines or shirasu laid out and dried while entwined in a single layer to form a large mat-like sheet. Typically, this is done by drying them in the sun on a bamboo frame, a process that is evocative of the manufacture of traditional Japanese paper.

Tatami Iwashi can then be cut to various sizes and used in different ways. Common serving styles include use as an ingredient in soup or cut into small pieces for use as a snack or accompaniment to sake or beer drinking, known as sakana.

This food item is named for its resemblance to a straw tatami mat common in traditional Japanese-style rooms or houses.

See also

 List of dried foods

External links 
 The process of making tatami iwashi (with Japanese text) can be seen here on the website of Japanese manufacturer Hamato (archived at the Internet Archive).

Dried fish
Fish products
Japanese seafood